Kwon Geun-Hae (born 30 December 1987) is a Korean team handball player. She played on the South Korean national team, and participated at the 2011 World Women's Handball Championship in Brazil.

References

1987 births
Living people
South Korean female handball players
Asian Games medalists in handball
Handball players at the 2006 Asian Games
Asian Games gold medalists for South Korea
Medalists at the 2006 Asian Games